The 2014 Dutch TT was the eighth round of the 2014 MotoGP season. It was held at the TT Circuit Assen in Assen on 28 June 2014.

In his 150th Grand Prix, Aleix Espargaró recorded his first-ever pole position through his career. However, Marc Márquez won his eight successive race. The second place was finished by Andrea Dovizioso and the podium was cleared by Dani Pedrosa, finished in third place.

Classification

MotoGP

Moto2

Moto3

Championship standings after the race (MotoGP)
Below are the standings for the top five riders and constructors after round eight has concluded.

Riders' Championship standings

Constructors' Championship standings

 Note: Only the top five positions are included for both sets of standings.

References

Dutch TT
Dutch TT
Dutch TT
Dutch TT